The Icechallenge (formerly known as the Leo-Scheu-Gedächtnislaufen or Leo Scheu Memorial) is an annual international figure skating competition organized by the Grazer Eislaufverein and sanctioned by the Austrian Figure Skating association and the International Skating Union. The event is usually held every autumn in Graz, Austria. Medals may be awarded in the disciplines of men's singles, ladies' singles, pair skating, and ice dancing. In 2014 and 2015, the Ice Challenge's senior events were part of the ISU Challenger Series. In 2021, the Icechallenge returned to the ISU Challenger Series under the name Cup of Austria.

History
The event began in 1971 as the Leo-Scheu-Gedächtnislaufen (Leo Scheu Memorial). It was re-titled the Icechallenge in 2008. The name Leo Scheu Memorial was retained for a junior, novice, and lower-level competition that is held in conjunction with the senior event. Leo Scheu was the founder of the ice skating club Graz and a member of the Nazi Party.

In 2011, the ISU designated the Icechallenge as one of the events at which skaters could achieve a minimum score. In 2014 and 2015, the Ice Challenge's senior events were part of the ISU Challenger Series. The 2016 edition was cancelled. 2017 the Icechallenge was held as international cmpetition only in single skating.

2021 the Icechallenge was back in ISU Challenger Series.

Senior medalists
CS: ISU Challenger Series

Men

Women

Pairs

Ice dancing

Junior medalists

Men

Ladies

Pairs

Ice dancing

Advanced novice medalists

Boys

Girls

Pairs

Ice dancing

References

External links
 Ice Challenge official website

 
ISU Challenger Series
International figure skating competitions hosted by Austria
Sport in Graz